Garissa County is an administrative county in Kenya. Its capital and largest urban area is Garissa.

Demographics
Garissa county has a total population of 841,353 persons of which 458,975 are males, 382,344 females and 34 intersex person. There is a total of 141,394 household with an average size of 5.9 persons per house hold. It has a population density of 19 persons per square kilometre.

Distribution of Population, Land Area and Population Density by County 

Source

Religion

Administrative and political units

Administrative units 
There are seven counties with 30 county assembly wards. There are 22 divisions sub-divided into 96 locations and 142 sub-locations.

It has six constituencies:
Garissa Township Constituency
Fafi Constituency
Dadaab Constituency
Lagdera Constituency
Balambala Constituency
Ijara Constituency

Political leadership 
Nathif Jama Adam was elected as the pioneer governor of Garissa in March 2013. Ali Bunow Korane became the second governor in 2017 but Nathif was re-elected in 2022. Nathif is currently deputised by Abdi Dagane Muhumed.

County executives (as of 5th January 2022)
 Mohamud Hassan Mursal - County Secretary
 Hassan Abdirizak - Agriculture, Livestock & Pastoral Economy, 
 Abass Ismail - Finance and Economic Planning, 
 Ahmed Mohamed - Water, Environment & Natural Resources, 
 Zahra Musa - County Affairs, Public Service & Intergovernmental Relations
 Ebla Minhaj - Education, Information & ICT
 Ahmednadhir Omar - Health, 
 Hawa Abdi - Culture, Gender, Youth & Sports, 
 Mohamed Suleiman - Trade, Investments & Enterprise Development, 
 Nasir Mohamed - Roads, Transport & Public Works
 Mohamed Hussein - Lands, Physical Planning & Urban Development

County Assembly
According to the new Constitution that was enacted in 2010,Garissa County has an assembly whose members are elected from single member constituencies known as wards. There are also nominated members to ensure two-thirds gender rule is followed. There are six nominated members to represent marginalised groups (persons with disabilities, and the youth) and a speaker who will be an ex-official member of the assembly.
A County Assembly member is elected for a term of five years. The Speaker is elected by the assembly members from among people who are not members of the Assembly. The Speaker presides over all sittings of the assembly and in his absence is deputised a deputy speaker who is elected from members within the assembly. The County assembly exercises an oversight over the County Government and makes laws that are necessary to ensure the smooth performance of the county government.

Education 
The county has 347 ECD centres, 224 primary schools, 41 secondary schools, 2 teachers training colleges and 2 public universities.

39.7 percent of the population can read and write and 57.9 cannot read and write. There is and an average of 8.2 percent literacy level and 74percent are illiterate.  
Source

Health 

There are a total of 111 health facilities distributes across the county, one level 5, 14 other hospitals, 29 health centres and 67 dispensaries.

Source

HIV/ADS is at the 1 percentage as compared to the national prevalent rate of 5.6 percentage.

Transport and communication 
A total of 2,700.6 km is classified as road network coverage comprising 1,637.84 km under county government and 1,062.76 km under national government. Of the total road network 420 km is covered by gravelled surface, 2,245.1 km earth surface and .5 km of bitumen surface.

There are 6 postal services with 2,600 installed letter boxes, 2,496 rented letter boxes 104 vacant letter boxes.

Trade and commerce 
The main crops grown are maize, greengrams, sorghum, rice, cowpeas, bananas, mangoes, pawpaw, water melon, tomatoes, capsicum and onions. Farmers have an average size of 1.5 hectares for small scale and 20 hectares for large scale. cattle (boran), goats (galla), sheep (black headed Persian) and camel (dromedary one humped) are kept as the main livestock for producing key products of meat, milk, hides and skins.

Services and urbanisation
 Source: USAid Kenya

See also

References

External links

Garissa County

 
Counties of Kenya
Somali-speaking countries and territories